Heinz Müller (born 1 February 1936) is a Swiss sprinter. He competed in the men's 100 metres at the 1960 Summer Olympics.

References

External links
 

1936 births
Living people
Athletes (track and field) at the 1960 Summer Olympics
Swiss male sprinters
Olympic athletes of Switzerland
Place of birth missing (living people)